John Cameron Saunders (born 1953 in Loudwater, Buckinghamshire) is a British chess player, writer, editor and journalist.

Chess career
Saunders learned to play chess at age seven, beginning competitive play after attending Royal Grammar School, High Wycombe (1963–1970). He continued his education at Selwyn College, Cambridge, obtaining a degree in Law and Classics.

Saunders reached a peak Elo rating of 2255 in January 1993 after winning several domestic open tournaments. He then played internationally for his home country Wales after being chosen first reserve board for the 1997 European Team Championship.

He became less active as a player and established a career in chess writing and journalism, first as editor of British Chess Magazine (1999 to July 2010), then editor of CHESS Magazine (from September 2010), as well as providing news coverage for BBC Ceefax. He has also authored instructive guides on chess covering a broad range of expertise, and is the founder and archivist of Britbase – a chess games database with objective to log the collected  of all major tournaments in British chess history.

Publications

References

External links

BritBase.info - List of all British Chess Champions from 1904 to present, maintained by John Saunders
CHESS website

1953 births
Living people
Welsh chess players
British chess writers
People educated at the Royal Grammar School, High Wycombe
Alumni of Selwyn College, Cambridge